Nathan Shore (born c. 1920) was a Canadian football player who played for the Edmonton Eskimos and Winnipeg Blue Bombers. He won the Grey Cup with Winnipeg in 1941. He played junior football in Winnipeg.

References

1920s births
Canadian football guards
Edmonton Elks players
Possibly living people
Winnipeg Blue Bombers players